Gifford Hall is a Grade II* listed house on the Common at Broughton Gifford, Wiltshire, England. It dates from around 1700 and is limestone ashlar with a hipped stone slate roof with stone stacks. It was built for the Harding family.

References 

Houses in Wiltshire
Grade II* listed buildings in Wiltshire
Grade II* listed houses